Central churchmanship describes those who adhere to a middle way in the Anglican Communion of the Christian religion and other Anglican church bodies, being neither markedly high church/Anglo-Catholic nor low church/evangelical Anglican in their doctrinal views and liturgical preferences. The term is used much less frequently than some others.

In The Claims of the Church of England, Cyril Garbett, Archbishop of York, used the term along with Anglo-Catholic, liberal, and evangelical as a label for schools within the Church of England, but also states:Within the Anglican Church are Anglo-Catholics, Evangelicals, Liberals and the great mass of English Churchmen who are content to describe themselves as Churchmen without any further label. 

The term came into use in the late nineteenth century when traditional high churchmen decided to distance themselves from Anglo-Catholicism and Ritualism. Central churchmen value both the official liturgies of the Church of England, which they clothe in a moderate amount of ceremony and a characteristically Anglican way of doing theology that is rooted in the Bible and the Creeds of the Early Church, whilst also valuing the contribution made by the English Reformation. In their theological thinking, they steer a middle course between the Anglo-Catholic and Evangelical parties, both of which are perceived as being extreme by Central Churchmen. F. A. Iremonger places William Temple among this group emphasizing that Temple had a firm hold on the articles of the historic creeds and a conviction that what is best in each school of thought within the church is worth conserving.

Perhaps the best-known exponent of the central churchman position in the twentieth century was Geoffrey Francis Fisher, Archbishop of Canterbury from 1945 to 1961. Other English bishops, including Robert Stopford, Henry Montgomery Campbell, and Mervyn Haigh also favored a central churchmanship approach, as a way of defusing tensions within their dioceses, and as a way of promoting a so-called "brand image" for the Church of England.

Since the 1970s central churchmanship as a distinct school of thought and practice within the Church of England has been in decline. This is partly due to the closure or merger of some theological colleges that used to favor the Central position—namely, Wells Theological College, Lincoln Theological College, and Tenbury Wells—and a drift towards theological liberalism, or Affirming Catholicism in others.

Overlap with "broad church" 
Traditionally "broad church" has been used to refer to a particular tendency within Anglicanism which flourished in the 19th century; however, it has recently been used as a virtual synonym for central churchmanship  and it appears that this is fairly standard in the United States.

References 

Anglican Churchmanship